Peanut-Butter Platform is an artwork by Dutch artist Wim T. Schippers. It consists of a floor covered with peanut butter and nothing else.

Background
The idea for Peanut-Butter Platform evolved from some of Schippers' earlier work. He installed two floor sculptures in a 1962 exhibit at Museum Fodor; he covered the entire floor of one gallery with salt, and another with shards of broken sheet glass.
The concept for Peanut-Butter Platform dates from 1962, a time when he began his association with the Fluxus movement; during the 1960s  he gained a reputation for absurdist and controversial works of art. He worked on short films as well, with Wim van der Linden and others, but his relations with the established art world were troubled and by the early 1970s he was working almost exclusively on writing and making television shows for the VPRO. Schippers referred to television as "the greatest gallery in the world".

Execution
Peanut-Butter Platform was first executed in 1969 in the Mickery gallery in Loenersloot. The work was redone in 1997 in conjunction with a Schippers retrospective at the Centraal Museum in Utrecht, and again in a gallery in 2010. Museum Boijmans Van Beuningen in Rotterdam bought the concept in 2010 and installed it in 2011. Museum director Sjarel Ex stated that it was "one of the most important acquisitions made in 2010". The artwork has flexible specifications, and may be installed in various ways. According to a museum newsletter, "Schippers' works are known for their beauty and their senselessness."

At least three visitors accidentally walked onto the floor, and were held responsible for the damage. Schippers fielded more than 500 questions asked via video on the blog Pindakaaspost.

On the occasion of Schippers' seventieth birthday, a replica/duplicate of the artwork was installed in the Willy Dobbeplantsoen in Olst.

References

External links
De Pindakaasvloer van Wim T. Schippers, at Museum Boijmans Van Beuningen, including video of the making of.

Wim T. Schippers
Installation art works
Olfactory art
1960s sculptures
Dutch contemporary art
Peanut butter